Mohamed Hassan M. Nur (died August 24, 2010) was a Somali politician, a member of the Transitional Federal Parliament.  He was among the people killed in the attack on the Hotel Muna in Mogadishu by al-Shabaab, as were fellow parliamentarians Geddi Abdi Gadid, Bulle Hassan Mo'allim, and Idiris Muse Elmi.

References

2010 deaths
Members of the Transitional Federal Parliament
Assassinated Somalian politicians
Terrorism deaths in Somalia
Year of birth missing